The Grassy Island Range Lights were a pair of lighthouses which were originally established to guide traffic through the channel into Green Bay harbor. They were deactivated and moved to shore as part of a channel-widening project.

History

Navigation to the mouth of the Fox River was impeded by a series of sand bars jutting out from either side of Green Bay, and thus in 1837 funds were appropriated for the purpose of erecting a light in the area. An initial recommendation to place such a light on Grassy Island (the most southerly of those bars) was countered by the observations of a Lt. Homans, who in visiting the area found the selected site "to be unsuitable for construction of buildings upon it of any durability, and totally uninhabitable by a keeper, being nearly under water, from the great rise of the lake, since the recommendation for a light upon it was made." Instead, the Long Tail Point Light was erected further north.

In 1866 dredging of a new channel into the harbor began. This new channel cut straight across Grassy Island, and an appropriation of $11,000 for construction of lights had been included in the 1864 budget. Due to the delays in the associated harbor improvements, the funds reverted to the treasury and a new appropriation had to be made in 1870, with construction of the two towers and associated keeper's house following in 1872. The two towers were largely identical except for their heights: freestanding wooden pyramidal towers covered in shingles, topped by octagonal lanterns holding sixth-order Fresnel lenses. Initially both displayed a fixed white light. One tower stood at either end of the cut on its eastern side, with the keeper's house standing between them.

The exposed location did lead to maintenance issues, with the roof of the dwelling being replaced in 1880, barely a decade after its construction. A new well was dug in 1884, the first having been filled in by a gale shortly after the station opened. The kitchen and boathouse were rebuilt in 1896; the boathouse was raised further in 1902. In the meantime a breakwater had been built to the east of the station.

This light was an obvious candidate for automation and was fitted with acetylene lamps in 1934; At the same time the characteristic of both lights was changed to green, with the front light flashing as well, in order to contrast with the lights of the city. All through the life of the station the channel was constantly being dredged and widened, and eventually the decision was made to expand to the east as well as west. Therefore, in 1966 the decision was made to tear down the lights. Members of the Green Bay Yacht Club petitioned the Corps of Engineers to be allowed to remove and preserve the towers. In November of that year the lights were moved to the parking lot of the club. Much of Grassy Island was removed, with a new automated beacon erected on what remains.

In 1998 the two towers were relocated to a breakwater at the edge of the yacht club property, and they were put through a lengthy restoration, being rededicated in 2005. They were listed on the National Register of Historic Places that year. 

Then in 2017 a decision was made to move forward with stabilization of the breakwater that had been deteriorating for a number of years and causing fears of the lighthouse foundations failing. For the next year and a half the breakwater was reinforced with steel pile. Additionally the breakwater was widened for two way vehicle traffic, parking area, safety railing, dock access, and other improvements. 

By the end of 2019 the final improvements had been completed and the "Lighthouse Park" had become a new permanent home for the Grassy Island Range Lights. The result was provided by the generous support of the David L. and  Rita E. Nelson Family Fund and the Community Foundation for the Fox Valley Region.

References

Buildings and structures in Green Bay, Wisconsin
Lighthouses on the National Register of Historic Places in Wisconsin
Tourist attractions in Brown County, Wisconsin
National Register of Historic Places in Brown County, Wisconsin